Freya Ann Alexandra Anderson  (born 4 March 2001) is a British swimmer, known primarily for her achievements as a freestyle sprinter, especially as a relay swimmer for Great Britain. Anderson achieved nine relay gold medals at three editions of the European Championships, including 5 golds in a single meet at the 2020 European Championships in Budapest, as well as two bronze medals at the Commonwealth Games and a bronze at the 2019 World Aquatics Championships. In July 2021, she won gold as part of the British team at the 2020 Tokyo Olympics in mixed 4 × 100 metre medley relay, swimming the freestyle anchor leg in the heat.

Individually, Anderson is a three-time European Junior and one-time World junior champion.

Early life
Anderson started swimming lessons at the age of five and began to swim competitively when she was nine. She attended St Joseph's primary school and then Upton Hall Convent School before winning a scholarship to Ellesmere College in Shropshire. Anderson was painfully shy as a child; she described how she almost fled College when she was caught breaking rules and using an iPad at night. At the time, she was scared of swimming and she would cry and scream when her mother took her to swimming lessons. Always tall for her age she would walk on the pool floor, and get in trouble for it. She credits swimming with boosting her confidence.

She hates swimming in the sea, lakes or any open water, and is allergic to chlorine.

Career
Anderson won the 2016 British Swimming Championships 100m freestyle, with a time of 54.35. Her swim in the heats, 54.40, eclipsed British Swimming’s 10 year record, and she proceeded to lower it again in the finals. Anderson won the Gold at 2016 European Junior Championships  in Hódmezővásárhely, Hungary, finishing 0.25 seconds ahead of the field in the 100m freestyle with a time of 54.72. Following a highly successful season Anderson won the Emerging Swimmer of the Year prize at the 2016 British Swimming Awards.

As a junior swimmer, Anderson won the 100 metre freestyle event at the 2017 World Junior Swimming Championships in Indianapolis. A year later she became the European Junior Champion at the 50 metre and 100 metre freestyle distances at the European Junior Swimming Championships. She was also part of the Great Britain team that won gold in the women's medley relay and a silver in the mixed medley relay in what was her breakthrough year in to the British senior team.

Anderson competed in the women's 100 metre freestyle event at the 2017 World Aquatics Championships.

At the 2018 Commonwealth Games Anderson made her Commonwealth Games debut, competing for England and won bronze in the 4×100 m freestyle relay and in the 4×200 m freestyle relay events.

At the 2018 European Championships, Anderson was part of the British team that won bronze in the mixed 4 × 200 metre freestyle relay, a new event at the game. She was also part of the British teams that won gold in the mixed 4 x 100 metre medley relay and gold in the women's women's 4 x 200m freestyle relay, and ended the championships with another bronze in the women's 4 × 100 metre medley relay. Anderson finished fourth in her individual 100 metre freestyle event, but set a new junior European record.

At the 2019 World Aquatics Championships held in Gwangju, South Korea, Anderson won a bronze as part of the team in the 4 × 100 m mixed medley relay. Anderson was named as a member of the "high quality" team to go to the postponed 2020 Olympics in April 2021. This was Anderson's first Olympics.

Anderson was named as a member of the British team to go to the postponed 2020 Olympics in Tokyo. This would be her first Olympics and she joined as part of what was considered a "high quality" swimming team. Anderson swam the anchor leg in the heat of the Mixed 4 x 100 metre medley relay, receiving a gold medal when the team, now with Anna Hopkin on anchor, won the final.

Anderson was appointed Member of the Order of the British Empire (MBE) in the 2022 New Year Honours for services to swimming.

See also
 List of Olympic medalists in swimming (women)

References

External links
 
 
 
 

2001 births
Living people
British female swimmers
British female freestyle swimmers
Commonwealth Games silver medallists for England
Commonwealth Games bronze medallists for England
Commonwealth Games medallists in swimming
European Aquatics Championships medalists in swimming
Medalists at the 2020 Summer Olympics
Olympic gold medalists in swimming
Olympic gold medallists for Great Britain
Olympic swimmers of Great Britain
Sportspeople from Birkenhead
Swimmers at the 2018 Commonwealth Games
Swimmers at the 2020 Summer Olympics
Members of the Order of the British Empire
Swimmers at the 2022 Commonwealth Games
21st-century British women
Medallists at the 2018 Commonwealth Games
Medallists at the 2022 Commonwealth Games